Tealium is a US headquartered American company founded in 2008 in San Diego, California that sells enterprise tag management, an API hub, a customer data platform with machine learning, and data management products. It has offices in the US, Singapore, UK, Germany, Japan, Netherlands, France and Australia.

History 
Tealium was founded in 2008 in San Diego, California, by Mike Anderson, Ali Behnam, and Olivier Silvestre who worked together at WebSideStory, a SaaS-based web analytics player that was acquired by Omniture and later by Adobe Systems. Jeff Lunsford, previously the CEO at Limelight Networks and WebSideStory, was appointed CEO of Tealium in January 2013.

In May 2019 the company announced Series F of investment and raised $55 million. The round was led by Silver Lake Waterman with ABN AMRO, Bain Capital, Declaration Partners, Georgian Partners, Industry Ventures, Parkwood and Presidio Ventures also participating. Its total valuation reached $850 million.

In January 2017, Tealium and Possible APAC became partners.

References

External links
 Tealium.com

Technology companies of the United States
Software companies established in 2008
Companies based in San Diego
2008 establishments in California